Blair Witch Volume II: The Legend of Coffin Rock is a survival horror video game developed by Human Head Studios for Microsoft Windows. It is a sequel to Blair Witch Volume I: Rustin Parr and was followed by Blair Witch Volume III: The Elly Kedward Tale.

Reception

Blair Witch Volume II: The Legend of Coffin Rock received "mixed or average" reviews, according to review aggregator Metacritic. In the United States, it sold 16,000 copies by October 2001.

Daniel Erickson reviewed the PC version of the game for Next Generation, rating it two stars out of five, and called the game short and repetitive, and having a problematic camera control.

The game went gold on October 17, 2000.

References

External links
 

2000 video games
Blair Witch
Gathering of Developers games
Psychological horror games
Single-player video games
Take-Two Interactive games
Video games based on films
Video games developed in the United States
Video games set in the 19th century
Windows games
Windows-only games
Video games about witchcraft
Video games scored by Rom Di Prisco
Video games set in Maryland
Human Head Studios games